Orme is both a surname and a given name. Notable people with the name include:

Surname
Christine Orme, American physicist
Daniel Orme (1766–1837), English artist, publisher and official Historical Engraver to George III
David Orme, English writer and poet
Denise Orme (1885–1960), English music hall singer
Dennis Orme (born 1938), former leader of the Unification Church in England 
Edward Orme (1775-1848), British engraver, publisher, property developer
Eliza Orme (1848–1937) First woman to earn a law degree in England
Fern Hubbard Orme (1903-1993), American politician and educator
Geoffrey Orme (1904–1978), British screenwriter
George Orme (1891–1962), American Major League baseball player
Ian Orme, American microbiologist
Nicholas Orme, British historian
Philibert de l'Orme (c. 1510–1570), French Renaissance architect
Robert Orme (1728–1801), British military historian
Stanley Orme, Baron Orme (1923–2005), British Labour Party politician
William W. Orme (1832–1866), American soldier and lawyer

Given name
Orme G. Stuart (1914–1990), Canadian businessman and naval officer
Sir David Orme Masson 1858–1937, English scientist
Leslie Orme Wilson (1876–1955), British soldier and politician
Richard Wilberforce, Baron Wilberforce (1907-2003), British barrister and judge
Christopher Orme Plummer, Canadian actor

See also
Orm (given name) 

English-language surnames